Ampithoidae is a family of amphipod crustaceans. The family has a worldwide distribution as algal dwellers. They commonly create tube-shaped nests on their host plants or algae which serve as both shelter and food. Young ampithoids develop from eggs to a larval stage within their mother's brood-pouch, formed by the appendages of her abdomen.

Genera
The World Register of Marine Species includes the following genera in this family:-

Amphithoides Kossmann, 1880
Amphitholina Ruffo, 1953
Ampithoe Leach, 1814
Austrothoe Peart, 2014
Biancolina Della Valle, 1893
Cymadusa Savigny, 1816
Exampithoe K.H. Barnard, 1926
Macropisthopus K.H. Barnard, 1916
Paradusa Ruffo, 1969
Paragrubia Chevreux, 1901
Paranexes Peart, 2014
Pleonexes Spence Bate, 1857
Plumithoe Barnard & Karaman, 1991
Pseudamphithoides Ortiz, 1976 (e.g. Pseudamphithoides incurvaria)
Pseudopleonexes Conlan, 1982
Sunamphitoe Spence Bate, 1857 (e.g. Sunamphitoe femorata)

References

Further reading
 
 

Corophiidea
Taxa described in 1871
Crustacean families